"Sweet Lovin'" is the second single from British musician Sigala. It features vocals from Bryn Christopher. It was released on 4 December 2015 as a digital download in the United Kingdom through Ministry of Sound. It is the follow-up to his UK number-one single "Easy Love". The song reached number 3 in the United Kingdom and number 6 in Ireland.

Critical reception
In a highly positive review, Lewis Corner of Digital Spy called the song "another tropical house thumper with a euphoric chorus and luscious, soulful vocals."

Music video
The official music video was filmed in Los Angeles, California. It was uploaded to Sigala's official Vevo channel on 13 November 2015. It features Candice Heiden (of LA Roller Girls Entertainment) rollerskating around the streets and leaving clouds of red smoke in her wake, causing anyone in the path of the smoke to dance to the tropical track's infectious beat. At the end of the video, she is joined by others including Nicole Leonard (also of LA Roller Girls Entertainment) and dancer Marissa Heart. The video has reached 240 million views on YouTube .

Track listing

Charts and certifications

Weekly charts

Year-end charts

Certifications

Release history

References

2015 singles
2015 songs
Bryn Christopher songs
Ministry of Sound singles
Number-one singles in Scotland
Sigala songs
Songs written by Bryn Christopher
Songs written by Sigala
Tropical house songs